Karasakhkal may refer to:

Yukhary Karasakkal, Azerbaijan
Qarabaqqal, Azerbaijan